Dalton, Ontario may refer to:

Dalton Township, Ontario, a former municipality now part of the city of Kawartha Lakes
Dalton, an unincorporated place in the Unorganized North Part of Algoma District and the location of Dalton, Ontario railway station

References